Penthouse, is a Mexican telenovela directed by Raúl Araiza Sr for Televisa in 1973. Starring Fanny Cano and Raúl Ramírez.

Cast 
Fanny Cano
Raúl Ramírez
Gregorio Casal
Germán Robles
Julieta Bracho
Leonor Llausás
Alejandro Parodi
Wolf Rubinsky
Martha Roth
José Loza
Miguel Gómez Checa
Arturo Benavides
Jesús Colin

References

External links 

Mexican telenovelas
1973 telenovelas
Televisa telenovelas
Spanish-language telenovelas
1973 Mexican television series debuts
1973 Mexican television series endings